George Henry Nee (March 12, 1876-March 4, 1952) was a private serving in the United States Army during the Spanish–American War who received the Medal of Honor for bravery.

Biography
Nee was born March 12, 1876, in Boston, Massachusetts, and joined the army from his birth city in September 1897. He was sent to the Spanish–American War with Company H, 21st U.S. Infantry as a private where he received the Medal of Honor for assisting in the rescue of wounded while under heavy enemy fire. He was discharged in 1900, but served again from 1905 until 1908.

George Nee died on March 4, 1952, and is buried in Forest Hills Cemetery and Crematory, Jamaica Plain, Massachusetts. His grave can be found on the Poinsettia Path.

Medal of Honor citation
Rank and organization: Private, Company H, 21st U.S. Infantry. Place and date: At Santiago, Cuba, 1 July 1898. Entered service at: Boston, Mass. Birth: Boston, Mass. Date of issue: 22 June 1899.

Citation:

Gallantly assisted in the rescue of the wounded from in front of the lines and under heavy fire from the enemy.

See also

List of Medal of Honor recipients for the Spanish–American War

References

External links

1876 births
1952 deaths
United States Army Medal of Honor recipients
United States Army soldiers
American military personnel of the Spanish–American War
People from Boston
Burials in Massachusetts
Spanish–American War recipients of the Medal of Honor